Rita Williams-Garcia (born 1957) is an American writer of novels for children and young adults .
In 2010, her young adult novel Jumped was a National Book Award finalist for Young People's Literature. She won the 2011 Newbery Honor Award, Coretta Scott King Award, and Scott O'Dell Award for Historical Fiction for her book One Crazy Summer. She won the PEN/Norma Klein Award. Her 2013 book, P.S. Be Eleven, was a Junior Literary Guild selection, a New York Times Editors Choice Book, and won the Coretta Scott King Award in 2014. In 2016 her book Gone Crazy in Alabama won the Coretta Scott King Award. In 2017, her book Clayton Byrd Goes Underground was a finalist for the National Book Award for young people's literature.

Life
Williams-Garcia was born in Queens, New York. Her father was in the military. 
She graduated from Hofstra University in 1980, where she studied with Richard Price and Sonya Pilcer.  She lives in Jamaica, New York. She taught for many years at Vermont College of Fine Arts.

Works
Blue Tights, Lodestar Books, 1988,  
Fast Talk on a Slow Track, Dutton, 1991, ; reprint, Paw Prints, 2008,  
Like Sisters on the Homefront, Lodestar Books, 1995, ; reprint, Paw Prints, 2008,  
; reprint, HarperCollins, 2002,  
; reprint HarperCollins, 2007,  
; reprint, HarperCollins, 2010,  

P.S. Be Eleven, 2013, 
Gone Crazy in Alabama, 2015
Bottle Cap Boys: Dancing on Royal Street, 2015
Clayton Byrd Goes Underground, 2017
A Sitting in St. James, published in May 2021 by Quill Tree Books, an imprint of HarperCollins Children's Books,

References

External links
"Warning: Characters May Appear As They Are or Why I Write Realistic Fiction", Hunger Mountain
"Author Interview: Rita Williams-Garcia on Jumped", Cynsations, March 27, 2009
"Learning About Rita Williams-Garcia", Rutgers
Mélina Mangal, Rita Williams-Garcia, Mitchell Lane Publishers, 2003, 
 

American children's writers
American young adult novelists
Newbery Honor winners
Hofstra University alumni
Vermont College of Fine Arts faculty
People from Queens, New York
20th-century American novelists
21st-century American novelists
20th-century American women writers
21st-century American women writers
1957 births
Living people
American women children's writers
American women novelists
Women writers of young adult literature
Novelists from New York (state)
Novelists from Vermont
American women academics